The Miyazaki Shining Suns were a Japanese basketball team that played three seasons in the bj league. They were based in Miyazaki, Miyazaki Prefecture.

Notable players
Marshall Brown (basketball, born 1985)
Brandon Cole
Hiroki Fujita
Ivan Harris
Abdullahi Kuso
Dexter Lyons
Jackie Manuel
Yuto Otsuka
Daisuke Takaoka
Ricky Woods (basketball)

Coaches
Koto Toyama
Junichiro Kitago
Kimitoshi Sano

External links
Team profile at Asia-basket.com

 
Defunct basketball teams in Japan
Sports teams in Miyazaki Prefecture
Basketball teams established in 2010
Basketball teams disestablished in 2013
Miyazaki (city)
2010 establishments in Japan
2013 disestablishments in Japan